AEW Road Rager is an annual professional wrestling television special produced by the American promotion All Elite Wrestling (AEW). Established in 2021, the original event aired as a special episode of the promotion's flagship weekly television program, Wednesday Night Dynamite. In 2022, it was expanded to a two-part event, with the second part airing as a special episode of Friday Night Rampage.

History
Due to the COVID-19 pandemic that began effecting the industry in mid-March 2020, All Elite Wrestling (AEW) held the majority of their programs from Daily's Place in Jacksonville, Florida; these events were originally held without fans, but the company began running shows at 10–15% capacity in August, gradually increasing as time went on, before eventually running full capacity shows in May 2021. Also in May, AEW announced that they would be returning to live touring, beginning with a special episode of Dynamite titled Road Rager on July 7, in turn becoming the first major professional wrestling promotion to resume live touring during the pandemic. Road Rager was announced to be held in Miami, Florida at the James L. Knight Center and was the first of a four-week span of special Dynamite episodes as part of AEW's "Welcome Back" tour, which continued with the two-part Fyter Fest on July 14 and 21 and concluded with Fight for the Fallen on July 28.

Events

See also
List of All Elite Wrestling special events
List of AEW Dynamite special episodes
List of AEW Rampage special episodes

References

External links

AEW Road Rager
Recurring events established in 2021
All Elite Wrestling shows